Münsterer Alte (in its upper course: Altnet) is a river of Bavaria, Germany. It passes through Münster and flows into the Lech south of Rain.

See also
List of rivers of Bavaria

References

Rivers of Bavaria
Rivers of Germany